Beethoven Romance is a ballet made by New York City Ballet ballet master in chief Peter Martins to the composer's Romance in F for violin and orchestra, Op. 50 (1805). The premiere took place 2 February 1989 at the New York State Theater, Lincoln Center, with costumes by Heather Watts and lighting by Mark Stanley.

Original cast
Kyra Nichols
Adam Lüders

External links 
NY Times review by Anna Kisselgoff, February 4, 1989
NY Times article by Anna Kisselgoff, February 26, 1989
NY Times review by Jack Anderson, June 20, 1989
NY Times review by Anna Kisselgoff, May 5, 1995
NY Times review by Anna Kisselgoff, February 16, 1999
NY Times review by Alastair Macaulay, June 30, 2008

Ballets by Peter Martins
Ballets to the music of Ludwig van Beethoven
1989 ballet premieres
New York City Ballet repertory